Jim Laugesen (born 10 November 1974) is a former Danish badminton player. He was the 1992 World Junior Champion in the mixed doubles event partnered with Rikke Olsen. He competed at the 2000 Summer Olympics in Sydney, Australia partnered with Michael Søgaard reaching in to the second round. Laugesen was dismissed from the Danmarks Badminton Forbund (DBS) center in September 2004. He now works as a badminton journalist at TV 2 in Denmark, and as a badminton coach in Gentofte Badminton Klub.

Achievements

European Championships 
Men's doubles

World Junior Championships 
Mixed doubles

European Junior Championships 
Boys' singles

Boys' doubles

IBF World Grand Prix
The World Badminton Grand Prix sanctioned by International Badminton Federation (IBF) since 1983.

Men's singles

Men's doubles

IBF International
Men's singles

Men's doubles

References

External links
 
 

1974 births
Living people
People from Gentofte Municipality
Danish male badminton players
Olympic badminton players of Denmark
Badminton players at the 2000 Summer Olympics
Sportspeople from the Capital Region of Denmark